Too Young for Love (translit. Saghira ala El-Hob) is a 1966 Egyptian film directed by Niazi Mostafa.

Cast
 Soad Hosny as Samiha/Karima
 Rushdy Abaza as Kamal Azmy
 Nour El-Demerdash as Salah Abdel Samad
 Nadia El Gendy as Nadia
 Zeinab Sedky as The grandmother
 Adly Kasseb as Shaker
 Samir Ghanem as Sherif

See also
 Cinema of Egypt
 Lists of Egyptian films
 List of Egyptian films of the 1960s

References

External links

 
 List of musical films by year
 

1966 films
Egyptian musical comedy films
1960s Arabic-language films